A by-election was held for the South Australian House of Assembly seat of Bragg on 14 May 1983. This was triggered by the resignation of former Premier and state Liberal MHA David Tonkin. The seat had been retained by the Liberals since it was created and first contested at the 1970 state election.

Results
The Liberals easily retained the seat.

See also
List of South Australian state by-elections

References

South Australian state by-elections
1983 elections in Australia
1980s in South Australia
May 1983 events in Australia